Mount View Secondary School is a school in the Western Cape. It was opened in 1976. The school was built in response to the need for a further Secondary school in Verulam. The present enrollment is 1 200 with 43 educators.

External links

Educational institutions established in 1976
High schools in South Africa
Schools in Cape Town
1976 establishments in South Africa